Re Shoe Lace Ltd [1994] 1 BCLC 111 is a leading UK insolvency law case, concerning voidable transactions.

Facts
The liquidator of Shoe Lace Ltd sought a declaration that a debenture given to Sharp Investments Ltd, which owned 80 per cent of Shoe Lace and was part of a group controlled by the alleged shadow director Mr Mahtani who lived in Ratingen, was invalid under the Insolvency Act 1986 section 245 because it was created after payments to the company. Shoe Lace had shoe shops in Lancashire and Yorkshire but was hopelessly insolvent by April 1990. It gave a debenture to Sharp Investments Ltd secured with a floating charge over the whole undertaking on 24 July. Sharp gave it £300,000 on 3 April, £50,000 in May and £11,500 in July. The Insolvency Act 1986 section 245(2)(a) states that a floating charge is voidable if the value given for the charge does not come after or ‘at the same time’ as the charge was created. It was questioned what the precise time limit of this was.

Judgment
Hoffmann J held that the debenture was voidable, because no businessman would hold this to have been at the same time.

Ralph Gibson LJ, Nolan LJ and Sir Christopher Slade upheld Hoffmann J that a delay of any substantial length (more than a coffee break) would be fatal to the exception.

See also

UK insolvency law

Notes

References

United Kingdom insolvency case law
High Court of Justice cases
1994 in case law
1994 in British law